Everything You're Searching for Is on the Other Side of Fear is the twelfth studio album by American electronica musician BT. It was initially set to be a 17-track album with sounds akin to those from This Binary Universe and _. The album was released two months after Between Here and You on December 13, 2019.

Track listing

References

External links
Everything You're Searching for Is on the Other Side of Fear on Black Hole Recordings

2019 albums
BT (musician) albums
Black Hole Recordings albums